Michael Donovan (born 1953) is a TV voice actor.

Michael Donovan may also refer to:
 Michael Donovan (kidnapper), jailed for the kidnapping of Shannon Matthews in January 2009
 Mike Donovan (musician) (born 1971), San Francisco based musician
 See Powell and Donovan for Mike Donovan, roboticist in Isaac Asimov stories
 Professor Mike Donovan (1847–1918), 19th-century middleweight boxing champion
 Mike Donovan (baseball) (1881–1938), American baseball player
 Mike Donovan, character in the science fiction TV series V, played by Marc Singer
 Michael Donovan (producer), Canadian film producer and screenwriter
 a fictional character